Geneva is a Metra commuter railroad station in Geneva, Illinois, served by Metra's Union Pacific West Line. Unless otherwise announced, inbound trains use the north platform and outbound trains use the south platform. Geneva is now the only station on the Union Pacific West Line that has not been triple tracked.

As of December 5, 2022, Geneva is served by 54 trains (28 inbound, 26 outbound) on weekdays, by all 10 trains in each direction on Saturdays, and by all nine trains in each direction on Sundays and holidays. Three inbound trains originate here, and one outbound train terminates here.

The station consists of two side platforms and a waiting room, with a ticket agent booth staffed on weekday mornings. Trains go east to Ogilvie Transportation Center in Chicago and west to Elburn, Illinois.

Since then, all of those trains were moved to Elburn, leaving all weekend trains to serve Geneva.

Bus connections
Pace
 592 St. Charles - Geneva Call-n-Ride 
 596 Batavia Call-n-Ride 
 801 Elgin/Geneva 
 802 Aurora/Geneva via Lake

References

External links

Metra stations in Illinois
Former Chicago and North Western Railway stations
Geneva, Illinois
Transportation buildings and structures in Kane County, Illinois
Railway stations in the United States opened in 1882
1882 establishments in Illinois
Union Pacific West Line